HAWT may refer to:  

 Health and welfare trust
 Horizontal-axis wind turbine
 Slang for physical attractiveness or sexual arousal (because it sounds like the English word hot)
 The Hawt House, a fictional location in the video game WarioWare: Touched!